State Route 121 (SR 121) is a 20.55 mile long north-south state highway in Middle Tennessee. It connects Elora with Broadview, Tims Ford Lake, and the state of Alabama.

Route description

SR 121 begins as a primary highway in Lincoln County at the Alabama state line, where it continues south as Madison County Route 65. It goes northeast through farmland to enter Elora, where it has an intersection with SR 122. The highway then turns northward to leave Elora and pass through farmland for a few miles to come to an intersection with US 64/SR 15. SR 121 turns into a secondary highway as it has a short concurrency with US 64/SR 15 before turning northeast and winding its way through hilly terrain as it parallels the Elk River to cross into Franklin County. The highway continues northeast through farmland to enter Broadview and come to an end at an intersection with SR 50.

Excluding the concurrency with US 64/SR 15, the entire route of SR 121 is a two-lane highway.

Major intersections

References

121
Transportation in Lincoln County, Tennessee
Transportation in Franklin County, Tennessee